Mitch Wilson (born 15 April 1996) is an Australian-born American rugby union player, currently playing for the . His preferred position is wing or fullback.

Early career
Wilson is from Sydney in Australia before moving to Oviedo, Florida as a fifteen year-old. He attended Life University where he won two Championships in 2018 and 2019.

Professional career
Wilson joined the New England Free Jacks ahead of the 2020 Major League Rugby season. He remained with the team in 2021 and 2022, before signing a two-year extension with the side in 2022.

Wilson represented the USA U20 team in 2016, before earning selection for the USA Selects in 2018 and 2019. He made his debut for the full United States side in 2022, making his debut against Kenya.

References

External links
itsrugby.co.uk Profile

1996 births
Living people
American rugby union players
United States international rugby union players
Rugby union wings
Rugby union fullbacks
New England Free Jacks players
Rugby union players from Sydney